Chicago Hounds may refer to:

Chicago Hounds (ice hockey team), defunct ice hockey team in Hoffman Estates, Illinois
Chicago Hounds (rugby union), rugby union team